Nazar Vyacheslavovych Malinovskyi (born 18 April 1998) is a Ukrainian professional footballer who plays as a defender for FC Kryvbas Kryvyi Rih.

Career
Malinovskyi is a product of FC Metalist Youth Sportive School System in Kharkiv.

After spending a short time in the Portuguese C.D. Aves, he signed in the summer of 2017 a contract with FC Zirka in the Ukrainian Premier League. He made his debut for FC Zirka as a substituted player in the second half-time in the match against FC Dynamo Kyiv on 18 November 2017 in the Ukrainian Premier League.

References

External links
 
 

1998 births
Living people
Ukrainian footballers
Association football defenders
FC Metalist Kharkiv players
Ukrainian expatriate footballers
Expatriate footballers in Portugal
C.D. Aves players
Ukrainian expatriate sportspeople in Portugal
FC Metalist 1925 Kharkiv players
FC Zirka Kropyvnytskyi players
FC Kremin Kremenchuk players
FC Hirnyk Kryvyi Rih players
Ukrainian Premier League players
Ukrainian Second League players